Five-time defending champion Martina Navratilova  defeated Steffi Graf in the final, 7–5, 6–3 to win the ladies' singles tennis title at the 1987 Wimbledon Championships. It was her eighth Wimbledon singles title and 16th major singles title overall.

Seeds

  Martina Navratilova (champion)
  Steffi Graf (final)
  Chris Evert (semifinals)
  Helena Suková (quarterfinals)
  Pam Shriver (semifinals)
  Gabriela Sabatini (quarterfinals)
  Manuela Maleeva-Fragnière (second round)
  Claudia Kohde-Kilsch (quarterfinals)
  Bettina Bunge (third round)
  Lori McNeil (second round)
  Catarina Lindqvist (fourth round)
  Wendy Turnbull (second round)
  Barbara Potter (second round)
  Katerina Maleeva (first round)
  Raffaella Reggi (fourth round)
  Sylvia Hanika (fourth round)

Hana Mandlíková was originally seeded #4 but withdrew due to injury before the tournament draw was made. All original seeds from 5-16 moved up one place, and a new #16 seed was added.

Qualifying

Draw

Finals

Top half

Section 1

Section 2

Section 3

Section 4

Bottom half

Section 5

Section 6

Section 7

Section 8

See also
 Evert–Navratilova rivalry

References

External links

1987 Wimbledon Championships – Women's draws and results at the International Tennis Federation

Women's Singles
Wimbledon Championship by year – Women's singles
Wimbledon Championships
Wimbledon Championships